Kelly Leanne Haxton (born September 2, 1982 in Calgary, Alberta) is a Canadian former soccer defender, who won the silver medal with the Canadian national team at the 2003 Pan American Games. She competed on the Canadian national team (roster and player pool) from 1999 to 2003.

Club career
Haxton signed for Vancouver Whitecaps FC of the W-League midway through the 2003 season.

References

External links

SoccerTimes

1982 births
Living people
Canadian women's soccer players
Canada women's international soccer players
Women's association football defenders
Soccer players from Calgary
USL W-League (1995–2015) players
Vancouver Whitecaps FC (women) players
Nebraska Cornhuskers women's soccer players
Purdue Boilermakers women's soccer players
Pan American Games silver medalists for Canada
Pan American Games medalists in football
Footballers at the 2003 Pan American Games
Medalists at the 2003 Pan American Games
21st-century Canadian women